The Xander automobile company was founded in 1901 by John G. Xander in Reading, Pennsylvania. This was after 10 years in the bicycle business. His first cars were steam, then gasoline engines were used. He only built his car custom order. In 1902, he stopped.

References 

Defunct motor vehicle manufacturers of the United States
Companies based in Reading, Pennsylvania
Vehicle manufacturing companies established in 1901
Vehicle manufacturing companies disestablished in 1902
1901 establishments in Pennsylvania
1902 disestablishments in Pennsylvania